Babak Ejlali  is an Iranian blogger, political dissident, editor of Rahsanews.com and human rights activist. On Monday, August 1, 2011, Iranian security forces raided and searched Ejlali’s house and summoned him to the Intelligence Agency. During this raid, Ejlali’s computer and personal notes were seized.

According to a report by Human Rights Activists News Agency (HRANA), Iranian security forces carried an arrest warrant for Ejlali. However, the attempt to arrest him failed because Babak Ejlali was not home at the time of the raid.

Ejlali is the editor of Rahsanews.com and a human rights activist. Because of his family ties and connections with the jailed Iranian blogger Hossein Ronaghi, Ejlali has been interviewed by various media outlets for information about Hossein Ronaghi’s condition.

See also 
Hossein Ronaghi
Youcef Nadarkhani
Reza Pahlavi

References

Living people
Iranian activists
1981 births
Iranian bloggers